Arshin is a rural locality (a settlement) in Samosdelsky Selsoviet, Kamyzyaksky District, Astrakhan Oblast, Russia. The population was 44 as of 2010. There is 1 street.

Geography 
Arshin is located 38 km southwest of Kamyzyak (the district's administrative centre) by road. Alexeyevka is the nearest rural locality.

References 

Rural localities in Kamyzyaksky District